Robert E. Otto (born December 12, 1962) is a former American football defensive end in the National Football League for the Dallas Cowboys and Houston Oilers. He played college  football at Idaho State University.

Early years
Otto attended Foothill High School, where he played tight end. He accepted a football scholarship from Idaho State University, where he was converted into a defensive end. He started a few games as a sophomore. He became a regular starter as a junior. 

He registered 45 tackles (6 for loss) as a senior. He finished his college career with 145 tackles (21 for loss).

Professional career

Seattle Seahawks (first stint)
Otto was selected by the Seattle Seahawks in the ninth round (248th overall) of the 1985 NFL Draft.

Dallas Cowboys
In 1986, he signed as a free agent with the Dallas Cowboys. He was released on September 1, 1986. He was signed on September 23, to replace defensive end Jesse Baker. He wasn't re-signed after the season.

Seattle Seahawks (second stint)
On April 3, 1987, he signed as a free agent by the Seattle Seahawks. He was placed on the injured reserve list on September 1, before being cut later in September.

Houston Oilers
In September 1987, he signed as a free agent with the Houston Oilers. He was released on October 27.

References

1962 births
living people
American football defensive ends
Dallas Cowboys players
Houston Oilers players
Idaho State Bengals football players
People from Pleasanton, California
Players of American football from California
Sportspeople from Alameda County, California